Lindapterys murex is a species of sea snail, a marine gastropod mollusk in the family Muricidae, the murex snails or rock snails.

Distribution
This marine species occurs off New Caledonia and Queensland, Australia.

References

  Hedley, C. 1922. A revision of the Australian Turridae. Records of the Australian Museum 13(6): 213–359, pls 42–56
 Lozouet, P., Ledon, D. & Lesport, J.F. 1993. Le genre Lindapterys (Neogastropoda, Muricidae): un exemple de disjonction de distribution en Domaine Tropical Marin. Geobios 27(1): 39–50 
 Houart, R. 1995. The Ergalataxinae (Gastropoda, Muricidae) from the New Caledonia region with some comments on the subfamily and the description of thirteen new species from the Indo-West Pacific. Bulletin du Muséum National d'Histoire Naturelle. Paris 4 16: 245–297

Gastropods described in 1922
Lindapterys